Edward Francis Harris (13 May 1834 – 26 July 1898) was a New Zealand  public servant, interpreter, landowner, genealogist. Of Māori descent, he identified with the Rongowhakaata and Te Aitanga-a-Hauiti iwi. He was born in Gisborne, East Coast, New Zealand on 13 May 1834.

References

1834 births
1898 deaths
Interpreters
New Zealand public servants
People from Gisborne, New Zealand
Rongowhakaata people
Te Aitanga-a-Hauiti people
New Zealand Māori public servants
New Zealand genealogists
19th-century translators